Janesville Township may refer to the following townships in the United States:

 Janesville Township, Waseca County, Minnesota
 Janesville Township, Greenwood County, Kansas